These hits topped the Dutch Top 40 in 2001 (see 2001 in music).

See also
2001 in music

2001 in the Netherlands
2001 record charts
2001